Splash Works is a  water park located within the park boundaries of Canada's Wonderland in Vaughan, Ontario, Canada.  Entry is free with park admission. Splash Works is home to "Whitewater Bay", the largest outdoor wave pool in Canada, and is today home to 16 waterslides. Splash Works operates during the summer months of May through September.

History

First expansion: 1992

It opened with four combo water slides: Body Blast, Whirl Winds, Pipeline and Drop Zone (later renamed Wipeout). It also included a lazy river and a kids area, Scooby Splash Islands, with some kiddie slides and a wading pool.

Second expansion: 1996

The year 1996 was the single largest expansion of the water park since its opening in 1992. It saw Splash Works expand to  through an expansion south of the Mighty Canadian Minebuster, so much so, some of the track had to be reconfigured so a bridge could be built over it. It essentially created a south side to the water park. The 1996 expansion saw the creation of White Water Bay, which is still the largest outdoor wavepool in Canada, along with the Black Hole waterslides and Pump House, an interactive spray ground.

Third expansion: 1999
The year 1999 was the third expansion of Splash Works. It saw the creation of two new slides, Super Soaker and the Plunge. While two separate rides, they share a common loading platform tower. The 1999 expansion also saw another bridge to the south side of Splash Works (behind these two slides). In addition, these two new slides and new bridge cross over Minebuster. The Plunge is a multi-person raft straight down a slide, and the Super Soaker is twisting water slide. They both use the same tube.

Fourth expansion: 2002

The year 2002 expansion of Splash Works saw the addition of Riptide Racer and Barracuda Blaster. Barracuda Blaster is bowl ride, and Riptide Race is an eight lane water carpet slide race. Barracuda Blaster took a part of the Lazy River for exiting out of the bowl and Riptide Racer also created a new waterfall for the Lazy River. Two new kiddie slides were added to Splash Island as well as an interactive water playground.

Fifth expansion: 2015
The latest expansion of Splash Works is planned for 2015. Canada's Wonderland announced two new additions in 2014, Typhoon and Splash Station. Typhoon, originally known as Topsy Turvy, was relocated from Ontario Place where it never opened. It features funnels and hairpin turns. The two attractions are built in the former area of Wipeout, near Muskoka Plunge.

2017 and Onwards
In 2016, Canada's Wonderland announced the addition of Muskoka Plunge, a quadruple drop pod slide that would replace the aging Body Blast. Around January 2017, it was discovered that Muskoka Plunge would be manufactured by SplashTacular, an American company that supplied larger versions to Six Flags New England and Six Flags America in 2014, and like them, Muskoka Plunge would feature several different ways to launch riders. These included simultaneously, one at a time, or roulette.

On National Rollercoaster Day 2017, alongside the announcements for Lumberjack and Flying Canoes, the rebranding and renovation of Splash Island to Lakeside Lagoon was announced. On 14 August, 2019, the park announced Mountain Bay Cliffs, a cliff jumping-style attraction featuring platforms of various heights, the highest of which being . Splash Works, alongside the rest of the main park remained closed throughout the 2020 season due to the COVID-19 pandemic. It opened in 2021.

Slides and attractions
Splash Works has removed three attractions since opening; Pipeline in 2001, Wipeout in 2004, and Body Blast in 2017.

Lakeside Lagoon
Lakeside Lagoon is a sub-area within Splash Works designed for the very youngest of children. The area opened in 1992 (alongside the rest of Splash Works) as Splash Island and opened with four slides, and it was expanded in 2002. In 2018, the name of Splash Island was changed to what it is known as today. In addition, Lakeside Lagoon doubled in size and introduced new interactive water features and children's slides alongside various aesthetic changes during this revamp, giving the area a more Canadian theme.

Lakeside Lagoon includes:

 Lakeside Lagoon Pool
 Waterways
 Lakeside Lagoon Kiddie Slides
 Spray Ground

See also
 List of Cedar Fair water parks

References

External links

 

Water parks in Canada
Cedar Fair water parks
1992 establishments in Ontario